Thomas Jürgen "Icke" Häßler (born 30 May 1966) is a German former professional footballer. He played as a midfielder throughout his career. At club level, he made a century of appearances for four teams: 1. FC Köln, Karlsruher SC and 1860 Munich in Germany and Roma in Italy, and spent a season apiece with Juventus, Borussia Dortmund and SV Salzburg.

Häßler also appeared over 100 times for the Germany national team. He was a member of the teams which won the 1990 FIFA World Cup (as West Germany) and UEFA Euro 1996. He also appeared at the 1994 and 1998 FIFA World Cups, the 1992 and 2000 UEFA European Championships, and the 1988 Olympic Games.

Club career

1. FC Köln (1984–1990)
Born in West Berlin, Häßler spent his early playing days in the youth team of Reinickendorfer Füchse. He began his professional career in 1984 with 1. FC Köln of the Bundesliga, for whom he played six successful years, helping the club to become Bundesliga runners-up in 1989 and 1990.

Juventus (1990–1991), Roma (1991–1994)
Soon after winning the 1990 World Cup with the German national team in Italy, Häßler transferred to Juventus for a sum of DM15 million. He spent only one year in Turin before he decided to join another Italian club, A.S. Roma, for a fee of DM14 million. This time he stayed for three years, making 88 appearances and scoring 11 goals.

Karlsruher SC (1994–1998)
In 1994, however, Häßler wanted to return to the Bundesliga. Despite offers from some of the biggest German clubs, he decided to sign with Karlsruher SC in a DM7 million  deal, the highest transfer sum the club has ever spent. In the following three years, Karlsruhe and its new key player achieved positions in the upper third of the table which resulted in UEFA Cup participations in 1996–97 and 1997–98.

By winning the UEFA Intertoto Cup in 1996, Karlsruhe not only qualified for the UEFA Cup but also accomplished to throw out Häßler's former club AS Roma in the second round of the tournament. In the first leg of the third round, Häßler scored twice in his team's 3–1 win over Brøndby IF in Copenhagen. However, shortly after this win Häßler received the first big injury in his career when he broke his leg in a league match against Fortuna Düsseldorf. Without its captain, Karlsruhe played a catastrophic second leg and was eliminated from the tournament after a 0–5 home defeat.
Following his recovery, Häßler returned for the last two games of the season and helped his team to finish in sixth place in the 1996–97 season, securing another year of international football competition. In the end, once again the club failed to survive the third round.

At the end of the 1997–98 season, the club's situation had worsened significantly. For the first time in his career, Häßler was confronted with a possible relegation. Feeling the pressure he once more showed his extraordinary skills and scored four goals in the last three games of the season. Despite Häßler's performances, Karlsruhe lost its last match in a dramatic season final and was relegated from the Bundesliga.

Borussia Dortmund (1998–1999)
Due to a contract clause, Häßler could leave Karlsruhe immediately on a free transfer. He decided to join Borussia Dortmund, which had won the UEFA Champions League in 1997. There he met the later assistant of the German national team, Michael Skibbe, then with 32 years the youngest head coach in the history of the Bundesliga. In the course of the season, there were some serious disputes between Häßler and Skibbe because the latter entrusted the midfield leadership to Andreas Möller. In the end, Häßler made only 18 appearances and never played over the full 90 minutes.

1860 Munich (1999–2003)
Disappointed about his season in Dortmund, Häßler left the club towards Bavaria and signed a contract with TSV 1860 Munich. He spent four very successful years in Munich and became an important part of the team. Already in his first season the club reached a sensational fourth place in the Bundesliga. After they failed to win against Leeds United in the qualification for the UEFA Champions League, Häßler and his team participated in the UEFA Cup. But also with 1860 Munich he failed to overcome the competition's third round. In the following two years, the club took part in the UEFA Intertoto Cup but didn't manage to succeed. After the 2002–03 season, Häßler left Munich to finish his career in Austria.

SV Salzburg (2003–2004)
In 2003, Häßler signed a one-year contract with the Austrian club SV Salzburg. He made 19 appearances and reached a seventh place in the 2003–04 season before he announced his retirement.

Overall, Häßler chalked up an entertaining 539 games and a total of 81 goals throughout a football career in which he was voted Footballer of the Year (Germany) in 1989 and 1992. Although he is considered one of the best German footballers of all time, he did not win a single major club title, having lost the UEFA Cup final with 1. FC Köln in 1986, the Coppa Italia final with AS Roma in 1993 and the DFB-Pokal final with Karlsruhe in 1996.

International career
For Germany, Häßler was capped 101 times, scoring 11 goals. Other than the two major tournament wins at the 1990 FIFA World Cup and the 1996 UEFA European Championship, he also played for his country at the 1994 and 1998 FIFA World Cups, Euro 92, and Euro 2000.

He also won a bronze medal for West Germany at the 1988 Summer Olympics. He was the dominant figure of the Euro 92, displaying performances that were reminiscent of Diego Maradona's 1986 World Cup exploits. He displayed a specialty for scoring spectacular free kicks, tireless stamina and dazzling dribbling sprees, as Germany went on to reach the final of the tournament. 

He holds the record for the most player assists in a single World Cup tournament, with five assists in 1994 FIFA World Cup, alongside with Pelé (1970), Robert Gadocha (1974), Pierre Littbarski (1982) and Diego Maradona (1986).

Style of play
A world-class playmaker, who was considered to be one of the best German players of the 1990s, Häßler was a talented, dynamic, and creative midfielder, with quick feet and a good right foot, who stood out for his speed, energy, and constant movement across the pitch. A diminutive player, despite not being particularly physically gifted, he was known for his technique and dribbling skills, as well as his ability to score goals or provide assists for teammates; he was also a free kick specialist, and stood out for his leadership throughout his career. He usually played as an offensive-minded central midfielder – known as the mezzala position, in Italy, although he was also capable of playing as a right winger, or even as a number 10, in either an attacking midfield role behind the forwards or as a second striker, a position in which he was tasked with playing between the lines and linking up the midfield with the attack; he was also used in a creative, holding midfield role on occasion. During his time in Italy, he was nicknamed "Tommasino" and "Pollicino" (Hop-o'-My-Thumb, in Italian), due to his short stature, while he was instead nicknamed "Icke" in Germany for his pronunciation of "Ich" (German for "I") in typical Berlin dialect.

Coaching career

Häßler was an assistant coach at 1. FC Köln. He previously served as an assistant coach to Berti Vogts when he was head coach of Nigeria but both were later sacked by the Nigerian FA.

Häßler interviewed for the managerial position at Scottish Premier League club Kilmarnock in June 2010. On 24 May 2014, he was named as the assistant coach of newly Iran Pro League promoted club, Padideh. He will work with his long-time friend, Alireza Marzban.

In February 2016 Häßler joined eighth division Bezirksliga side Club Italia Berlin as their new coach with the self-declared aim of eventual promotion to the 3. Liga.

Trivia
Häßler founded the music label MTM Music in March 1996. He participated in the 2016 season of German dance show Let's Dance. In 2017, Häßler participated in German television show Ich bin ein Star – Holt mich hier raus!.

Career statistics

Club

International

Scores and results list Germany's goal tally first, score column indicates score after each Häßler goal.

Honours
1. FC Köln
 UEFA Cup runner-up: 1985–86
 Bundesliga runner-up: 1988–89, 1989–90

Juventus
 Supercoppa Italiana runner-up: 1990

Roma
 Coppa Italia runner-up: 1992–93
 Supercoppa Italiana runner-up: 1991

Karlsruher SC
 DFB-Pokal runner-up: 1995–96

Germany
 FIFA World Cup: 1990
 UEFA European Championship: 1996
 UEFA European Championship runner-up: 1992
 Summer Olympic Games: Bronze medal 1988

Individual
 kicker Bundesliga Team of the Season: 1987–88, 1988–89, 1989–90, 1995–96
 Footballer of the Year in Germany: 1989, 1992
 FIFA World Cup Most Assists: 1994
 UEFA European Championship Team of the Tournament: 1992
 FIFA World Player of the Year: Bronze Award 1992
 FIFA XI: 1999

See also
List of men's footballers with 100 or more international caps
List of people from Berlin

References

External links
Official website of Thomas Häßler in German

1966 births
Living people
1990 FIFA World Cup players
1994 FIFA World Cup players
1998 FIFA World Cup players
1. FC Köln players
A.S. Roma players
Association football midfielders
Austrian Football Bundesliga players
Borussia Dortmund players
Expatriate footballers in Austria
Expatriate footballers in Italy
FC Red Bull Salzburg players
FIFA Century Club
FIFA World Cup-winning players
Bundesliga players
Footballers at the 1988 Summer Olympics
German expatriate footballers
German expatriate sportspeople in Italy
German footballers
Germany international footballers
Germany under-21 international footballers
Juventus F.C. players
Karlsruher SC players
Olympic bronze medalists for West Germany
Olympic footballers of West Germany
Footballers from Berlin
Serie A players
TSV 1860 Munich players
UEFA Euro 1992 players
UEFA Euro 1996 players
UEFA Euro 2000 players
UEFA European Championship-winning players
Olympic medalists in football
Ich bin ein Star – Holt mich hier raus! participants
People from Reinickendorf
Medalists at the 1988 Summer Olympics
West German footballers